The Consulate General of the United States in Frankfurt am Main represents the interests of the United States government in Frankfurt, Germany and nearby surrounding areas. It is the largest Consulate General of the US, and is larger, in terms of both personnel and facilities, than many US Embassies.  Technically a part of Mission Germany, and reporting through the Embassy of the United States in Berlin, the Frankfurt Consulate General operates with a significant degree of autonomy when compared to other U.S. Consulates.  This is due in part to several large U.S. government regional centers housed within the Consulate, which provide support in the areas of security, construction, and financial matters to a number of other U.S Diplomatic posts located throughout Europe, the Middle East and Africa.

In 2006 the Frankfurt Consulate General relocated most all of its operations to a single facility - a former hospital, once operated by the U.S military, and before that by the German military during World War II. The refurbished and now modified building is quite large and expansive. The Frankfurt Consular district covers the German states of Hesse, Rhineland-Palatinate, Baden-Württemberg, and Saarland.

Use by intelligence agencies

In March 2017 a series of documents, referred to as Vault 7, released by WikiLeaks revealed that the US government uses the consulate as a base for cyber operations. This diplomatic representation was known to be the largest US consulate worldwide, in terms of both personnel and facilities, and has played a prominent role in the US government's intelligence architecture for years. The intelligence personnel including CIA agents, NSA spies, military secret service personnel, the US Department of Homeland Security employees and the Secret Service employees are working in the building complex with high walls and barbed wire in the north of the city. In a radius of about 40 kilometers around Frankfurt, the Americans had also established a dense network of outposts and shell companies in Frankfurt. WikiLeaks documents reveal the Frankfurt hackers, part of the Center for Cyber Intelligence Europe (CCIE), were given cover identities and diplomatic passports to obfuscate customs officers to gain entry to Germany. The CIA station, in the consulate, is said to also collect Iranian intelligence in Europe, surveil on Iranian officials and target possible defectors who work in Iran's nuclear weapons program.

References

External links
 Official U.S. Consulate General Frankfurt web page

Frankfurt
United States
Germany–United States relations